Betterman v. Montana, 578 U.S. 437 (2016), was a United States Supreme Court case which held that the right to a speedy trial does not guarantee the right to speedy sentencing.  It was decided on May 19, 2016.

Background 
Brandon T. Betterman was charged with an assault on a family member in 2011, but failed to show up at a Montana court room.  In April 2012, Betterman pleaded guilty to jumping bail.  He spent 14 months in a county jail in Montana while waiting for his sentence.  In the summer of 2013, the judge sentenced him to seven years in prison, with four years suspended. Betterman ultimately appealed his case to the Supreme Court of the United States, where argued that holding him in the county jail for 14 months violated his constitutional rights, because the right to a speedy trial guaranteed under the Speedy Trial Clause of the Sixth Amendment extended to speedy sentencing.

Opinion of the Court 
In a unanimous 8–0 ruling, the Montana Supreme Court's decision was upheld. Associate Justice Ruth Bader Ginsburg wrote the decision in an 11-page opinion.

See also 
 List of United States Supreme Court cases
 Lists of United States Supreme Court cases by volume
 List of United States Supreme Court cases by the Roberts Court

References

Further reading

External links
 

United States Supreme Court cases
United States Supreme Court cases of the Roberts Court
Montana state case law
2016 in case law
Speedy Trial Clause case law